The 2011 Valencia GP3 Series round was the third round of the 2011 GP3 Series season. It was held on June 24–26, 2011 at Valencia Street Circuit, Valencia, Spain, supporting the 2011 European Grand Prix.

Classification

Race 1

Race 2

Notes
 – Zimin and Nunes were given a ten grid position penalty for causing collisions in Race 1.

Standings after the round

Drivers' Championship standings

Teams' Championship standings

 Note: Only the top five positions are included for both sets of standings.

See also 
 2011 European Grand Prix
 2011 Valencia GP2 Series round

References

External links
GP3 Series official website: Results

Valencia
Valencia